Peter Adolf Hall, also known as PA Hall or Peter Adolphe Hall, (23 February 1739 in Borås – 15 May 1793 in Liège), was a Swedish-French artist who mainly devoted himself to miniature painting.

Early life
Hall was born to a merchant and magistrate in Borås, who was also a Member of Parliament, Petter Börjesson Hall (1707-1776) and Eva Margareta. Eva was an older cousin of the astronomer Pehr Wilhelm Wargentin. Together with his younger brother Birger Martin, Hall studied medicine and 'natural history' between 1753-55 at Uppsala University's medical faculty where Carl Linnaeus taught. In the following years, 1755–59, the brothers went on a period-style educational journey in Europe under the guidance of a teacher, Mr. Lars Brisman. In Berlin and Hamburg, Peter Adolf acquainted himself both with playing music and took a liking to the visual arts. To his father's chagrin, he started working in enamel and miniature painting instead of becoming a doctor.

Career
In May 1766 Hall began to work as an artist in Paris. Three years later, at the age of 30, he was elected to the French Academy of Fine Arts. He painted portraits of the Dauphin of France, the prospective Louis XVI, as of his two brothers, who also would ascend the throne eventually, after the Revolution and the Napoleonic period, namely, Louis XVIII and Charles X. Peter Adolf Hall was then appointed a court painter or Peintre du Roi et des Enfants de France. According to an account book kept by his wife, between the years 1782-87 Hall painted an average of 70 portraits a year, of nobilities in general and people from the fashionable society. His annual income was around 25,000 livres.

Family

He married April 23, 1771 with a merchant's daughter Marie Adelaïde Gobin (1752-1832) in the newly built parish church of Saint-Louis at Versailles. They would in time have three daughters and a son. He encouraged his eldest daughter Adélaïde Victoire Hall's talent for visual arts, and played the flute with his second daughter, the musical Angélique Lucie Hall (1774-1819) who played the piano. His third daughter was named Adolphine Mélanie Isabelle Hall (1777-1852) and the fourth child was the son Gabriel Hippolyte Adolphe Hall (1780-1833).

Exile

Peter Adolf Hall was a strong supporter of Jean-Jacques Rousseau's ideology. Among those who visited his home on the Rue du Petit-Reposoir in Paris were not only the art world participants and patrons but also the Marquis of Lafayette. Hall was present at the Storming of the Bastille as a revolutionary officer. In 1791 he went into exile though and never reunited with his family in Paris ever again. His wife's inherited wealth was confiscated by the nation and a son-in-law married to the painter's first-born was torn to pieces by a mob six weeks after their wedding. Hall supported his family from abroad as best as he could, but died in Belgium a few years later.

References 
 Lennart Andersson Palm: Peter Adolf Hall - The most famous borås author. In: Boras's history I (2005), pp. 173–78.
 Karl Asplund: Peter Adolf Hall. A biographical sketch. National Museums Yearbook. (1938).
 Karl Asplund: Peter Adolf Hall. In: Sixten Strömbom (eds): Five Great Gustavian (Collins, 1944)
 Per Bjurström: Swedish artist lexicon (1957), Part III
 Görel Cavalli-Björkman: Swedish miniature painting: an art book from National Museum (Raben & Sjogren, 1981) 
 Torben Holck Colding: Aspects of Miniature Painting (Copenhagen, 1953)
 Denis Diderot and others.: Reviews of Hall's works (1769–89), at the annual Paris salon group exhibition, from among others. a Mercure de France and L'Avantcourer. Although excerpts from General newspapers Halls activity in Paris. (Uppsala University Library, Manuscript Department, S-L Gahm-Persson collections (Dossier X 211).
 Nils Forssell: Peter Adolf Hall and Boras. In: Boras's history 2 (1953), pp. 150–54.
 Johan Fredrik Höckert: Peter Adolf Hall In Series: Champion of Swedish Art (6) (Malmo, 1950) p. 156
 Regine de Plinval the Guillebon: Pierre Adolphe Hall 1739-1793, Miniaturiste anglais, Peintre du Roi et des Enfants de France (Paris, 2000)
 Oscar Levertin: Niklas Lafrensen D. Y. and relations between Swedish and French painting in the 1700s (the Royal Hofboktryckeriet, 1899). Section of Hall pages 52–63 and pages 158-163.
 John Zaméo Lofgren: The miniatures of Peter Adolf Hall, PhD thesis, Univ of Oregon (Ann Arbor, Mich.: University Microfilms International, 1976) p. 247
 Axel Sjöblom: Comments on Peter Adolf Hall's technology. In: Sixten Strömbom (eds): Five Great Gustavian (Collins, 1944)
 Seth Tingvallsgatan: Peter Adolf Hall - Boras greatest son. In: The seven counties agree Yearbook (1960)
 Fredric Villot: Hall, Celebre Miniaturiste You Xviii Siècle: Sa Vie, Ses oeuvres, Sa Correspondance (Paris 1867, 2010)

External links

1739 births
Members of the Royal Swedish Academy of Arts
1793 deaths
18th-century Swedish painters
18th-century Swedish male artists
Swedish male painters
French people of Swedish descent
Rococo painters
French portrait painters
Portrait miniaturists
18th-century French people
Age of Liberty people